Potato Creek is an unincorporated community in Jackson County, in the U.S. state of South Dakota.

History
A post office called Potato Creek was established in 1935, and remained in operation until 1962. The community was named after the creek of the same name.

References

Unincorporated communities in Jackson County, South Dakota
Unincorporated communities in South Dakota